Ferdinand Waldo Demara Jr. (1921 – June 7, 1982) was an American impostor.

He was the subject of a movie: The Great Impostor, in which he was played by Tony Curtis.

Demara's impersonations included a naval surgeon, a civil engineer, a sheriff's deputy, an assistant prison warden, a doctor of applied psychology, a hospital orderly, a lawyer, a child-care expert, a Benedictine monk, a Trappist monk, an editor, a cancer researcher, and a teacher. One teaching job led to six months in prison.

There are not many facts that have been proven about Demara, only speculation, as there are only a few articles and movies about him that were created during his lifetime. Demara was said to possess a true photographic memory and was widely reputed to have an extraordinary IQ. He was apparently able to memorize necessary techniques from textbooks and worked on two cardinal rules: The burden of proof is on the accuser and When in danger, attack. He described his own motivation as "Rascality, pure rascality".

Early life and adulthood 
Demara, known locally as 'Fred', was born in Lawrence, Massachusetts, in 1921. His father, Ferdinand Waldo Demara Sr., was born in Rhode Island and worked in Lawrence's old Theatre District as a motion picture operator. Demara Sr. was financially well-off, and the family lived on Jackson St. in Lawrence, an upper-class neighborhood. Demara Sr.'s brother Napoleon Demara Sr. owned many of the theatres in Lawrence, in which Demara Sr. was an active union member. Early in the Great Depression, Fred's father became financially insolvent, forcing the family to move from the Tower Hill neighborhood to the poorer section in the city, at 40 Texas Avenue in the lower southwest Tower Hill neighborhood.

During this financially troubled time, Demara Jr. ran away from home at age 16 to join the Trappist monks in Rhode Island. After two years, he was told he wasn't suited to being a Trappist and was sent instead to a Brothers of Charity home near Montreal, Canada. He was then transferred to a Brothers of Charity boys home in West Newbury, Massachusetts, where he taught fourth grade.

After running away from the Brothers of Charity after an argument with his superior, he joined the United States Army in 1941.

Impersonations 
The following year, Demara began his new lives by borrowing the name of Anthony Ignolia, an army buddy, and going AWOL. He joined the Abbey of Our Lady of Gethsemani, a Trappist monastery in Kentucky under his assumed identity. However, he met an acquaintance from his first Trappist monastery, and so he left before his true identity could be revealed. He then moved to the New Melleray Abbey near Dubuque, Iowa, before finally returning home. His father encouraged his son to turn himself in to the military police for his desertion but he did not.

He then joined the Navy where he trained as a hospital corpsman. He did not reach the position he wanted, faked his suicide and borrowed another name, Robert Linton French, and became a religion-oriented psychologist. "Dr French" then presented himself at the New Subiaco Abbey, a Benedictine monastery in Arkansas, as a would-be Catholic convert. However, after a few weeks "he was summoned to the abbot's office, where he was accused of having forged his documents". He denied the accusations but left the monastery. He travelled to Chicago where he joined the Clerics of Saint Viator, before moving on to the Order of St. Camillus in Milwaukee. After once more arguing with his superiors, this time over his lack of cooking skills, he left and moved to New Jersey where he joined the Paulist novitiate in Oak Ridge.

As "Dr French", he applied for various jobs at Catholic colleges and was eventually employed to teach psychology at Gannon College (now a university) in Erie, Pennsylvania. Being made dean of the School of Philosophy, he taught general psychology, industrial psychology and abnormal psychology, and published a "well-received booklet" titled How to Bring Up Your Child. He left after "an unfortunate incident involving forged checks". He was briefly a member of the Benedictine Saint Bede's Abbey, Peru, Illinois, before joining the Brothers Hospitallers of Saint John of God.

Afterwards, Demara served as an orderly in a Los Angeles sanitarium, and served as an instructor in St. Martin's College (now a university) in the state of Washington. The FBI captured him, and he served 18 months at the Naval Disciplinary Barracks, San Pedro, California, for desertion.

After his release he assumed a fake identity and studied law at night at Northeastern University, then joined the Brothers of Christian Instruction in Maine, a Roman Catholic order.

While at the Brothers of Christian Instruction, he became acquainted with a young Canadian surgeon named Joseph C. Cyr. That led to his most famous exploit, in which he masqueraded as Cyr, working as a trauma surgeon aboard HMCS Cayuga, a Royal Canadian Navy destroyer, during the Korean War. He managed to improvise successful major surgeries and fend off infection with generous amounts of penicillin. His most notable surgical practices were performed on some sixteen Korean combat injuries who were loaded onto the Cayuga. All eyes turned to Demara, the only "surgeon" on board, as it became obvious that several of the injured soldiers would require major surgery or certainly die. After ordering personnel to transport these variously injured patients into the ship's operating room and prep them for surgery, Demara disappeared to his room with a textbook on general surgery and proceeded to speed-read the various surgeries he was now forced to perform, including major chest surgery. None of the soldiers died as a result of Demara's surgeries. Apparently, the removal of a bullet from a wounded man ended up in Canadian newspapers. One person reading the reports was the mother of the real Joseph Cyr; her son at the time of "his" service in Korea was actually practicing medicine in Grand Falls, New Brunswick. When news of the impostor reached the Cayuga, still on duty off Korea, Captain James Plomer at first refused to believe Demara was not a surgeon (and not Joseph Cyr). However, faced with the embarrassment of having allowed an impostor into the navy's ranks, Canadian officials chose not to press charges. Instead, Demara was quietly dismissed from the Royal Canadian Navy and forced to return to the United States. The MASH episode Dear Dad... Again included a one time character Captain Adam Casey, likely inspired by Demara's exploits, who performs several surgeries, but turns out not to be a real surgeon.

Philosophy behind Demara's impersonations 
Demara told his biographer he was successful in his roles because he was able to fit into positions which no one else had previously occupied. Demara explained it in the following excerpt from his biography:

Demara referred to it as 'expanding into the power vacuum,' and described as such; 'if you come into a new situation (there's a nice word for it) don't join some other professor's committee and try to make your mark by moving up in that committee. You'll, one, have a long haul and two, make an enemy.' Demara's technique was to find his own committee. 'That way there's no competition, no past standards to measure you by. How can anyone tell you aren't running a top outfit? And then there's no past laws or rules or precedents to hold you down or limit you. Make your own rules and interpretations. Nothing like it. Remember it, expand into the power vacuum!'
In his later years he joined the Los Angeles Adventurers Club,  was noted as the only person to lie their way into the club.

Founded a college 
During Demara's impersonation as Brother John Payne of the Christian Brothers of Instruction (also known as Brothers of Christian Instruction), Demara decided to make the religious teaching order more prominent by founding a college in Alfred, Maine. Demara proceeded on his own, and got the college chartered by the state. He then promptly left the religious order in 1951, when the Christian Brothers of Instruction offended him by not naming him as rector or chancellor of the new college and chose what Demara considered a terrible name for the college. The college Demara founded, LaMennais College in Alfred, Maine, began in 1951 (when Demara left); in 1959 it moved to Canton, Ohio, and in 1960, became Walsh College (now Walsh University).

Minor fame 
After this episode, he sold his tale to Life and worked in short-term jobs, since he had become widely known. Only after he returned to his old tricks and possessed fake credentials could he get another job at a prison in Huntsville, Texas. According to his biographer, Demara's past became known and his position untenable when an inmate found a copy of Life with an article about the impostor.

On November 5, 1959, Demara appeared on the surrealistic game show hosted by Ernie Kovacs, Take a Good Look. The object was for one of the three celebrity panelists to guess his identity. One week later on November 12, 1959, he appeared on an episode of the TV quiz show You Bet Your Life, with Groucho Marx.  Demara recounted his exploits, and said the $1,000 he earned on the program was going to be donated to the 'Feed and Clothe Fred Demara Fund'.

Demara continued to use new aliases but, as a result of his self-generated publicity, it became much harder to accomplish impersonations than before. In 1960, as a publicity stunt, Demara was given a small acting role in the horror film The Hypnotic Eye. He appears briefly in the film as a (genuine) hospital surgeon. By this point, Demara's girth was so notable that he could not avoid attracting attention. Demara had already been considerably overweight during his impersonation of Joseph C. Cyr.

Later life 

In the early 1960s, Demara worked as a counselor at the Union Rescue Mission in downtown Los Angeles. In 1967 Demara received a graduate certificate from Multnomah School of the Bible in Portland, Oregon. His first ministerial assignment was as a pastor of the Cherry Grove Baptist Church in Gaston, Oregon. He was very well liked but soon plagued with rumors about his old life, causing him to resign the position. Many parishioners felt this was yet another con, though many others felt he was taking the position seriously and had legitimate credentials. Demara then served as pastor of Toutle Lake Community Bible Church in Toutle, Washington for several years. Following that, he moved to Friday Harbor, Washington in the San Juan Islands where he worked as a school bus driver. He was a guest on the Tom Snyder show where he discussed his life, and his occupation as a chaplain.

Demara had various friendships with a wide variety of notable people during his life, including a close relationship with actor Steve McQueen, to whom Demara delivered last rites in November 1980.  Tony Curtis, on the Tom Snyder television show, claimed that his favorite role was not the "Boston Strangler", nor his role in the renowned comedy "Some Like it Hot", but his role in the movie "The Great Imposter", portraying Demara.

When Demara's past exploits and infamy were discovered in the late 1970s, he was almost dismissed from the Good Samaritan Hospital of Orange County in Anaheim, California, where he worked as a visiting chaplain. Chief of Staff Philip S. Cifarelli, who had developed a close personal friendship with Demara, personally vouched for him and Demara was allowed to remain as chaplain. Demara was a very active and appreciated minister, serving a variety of patients in the hospital. Few of those with whom he interacted at the hospital knew of his colorful past. Due to limited financial resources and his friendships with Cifarelli and Jerry Nilsson, one of the major owners of the hospital, Demara was allowed to live in the hospital until his death, even after illness forced him to stop working for them in 1980.

Demara died on June 7, 1982, at the age of 60 due to heart failure and complications from his diabetic condition, which had required both of his legs to be amputated. According to his obituary in The New York Times, he had been living in Orange County, California, for eight years. He died at Nilsson's home in Anaheim, California.

In media 
Demara's story was recounted in the 1960 book, The Great Impostor, written by Robert Crichton and published by Random House. The book was a New York Times bestseller and adapted into a 1961 film by the same name starring Tony Curtis as Demara. A second book by Crichton, The Rascal and the Road, recounted Demara and Crichton's experiences together as Crichton conducted research for The Great Impostor.

Music
 The Band recorded a song, "Ferdinand the Imposter", released on a 2005 reissue of The Basement Tapes.
 The Fleetwoods recorded a song, "(He's) The Great Imposter", which was inspired by Demara's story.

Books

Films/TV 
 The Great Impostor (1960) is a feature film of a fictionalised version of Demara's life, starring Tony Curtis as Demara.
 In ""Dear Dad... Again", a 1973 episode of the TV series M*A*S*H, Hawkeye exposes a fraudulent surgeon; the plot was inspired by Demara.
 The protagonist of the TV series The Pretender, Jarod, is inspired by (but not based on) Demara.
 In the manga series One Piece, a character named Demaro Black impersonated the main character, referring to Demara's impersonations.

Podcasts 

 The Podcast Things I Learned Last Night covered Demara's story in Episode 94 Ferdinand Waldo Demara.

Notes

External links 
 Obituary, The New York Times
 
 
 Article on Demara (archived) at CFB Esquimalt Naval and Military Museum
 HMCS Cayuga history page
 Recollection of Demara as Dr. Joseph Cyr by Retired Commander Peter G. Chance in his book 
 

1921 births
1982 deaths
People from Lawrence, Massachusetts
Canadian military personnel of the Korean War
Impostors
Multnomah University alumni
Hoaxes in the United States
Trappists
American monks
United States Army soldiers
United States Army personnel of World War II
Canadian amputees
American amputees
People who faked their own death
Brothers of Charity